Annapurna Devi (1927 – 13 October 2018) was an Indian surbahar (bass sitar) player of Hindustani classical music. She was given the name 'Annapurna' by former Maharaja Brijnath Singh of the former Maihar Estate (M.P.), and it was by this name that she was popularly known. She was the daughter and disciple of royal court musician Allauddin Khan and Madina Bibi, and the first wife of the sitar player Ravi Shankar. After her separation from Ravi Shankar, she moved to Bombay and never performed again in public. She remained a private person, yet continued to teach music for free. Her students include many notable disciples including Hariprasad Chaurasia, Nityanand Haldipur and Nikhil Banerjee.

Biography
Annapurna Devi, born Roshanara Khan, on 15 April 1927 [confirmed by Lajo ji] at Maihar, a small princely state of British India (now a part of Madhya Pradesh, India). Her father Alauddin Khan was a royal court musician at the court of Maharaja Brijnath Singh (Maihar State), who named the newborn girl 'Annapurna'.

Her father and guru Alauddin Khan, founder of the "Senia Maihar gharana" or "Senia Maihar School" of Hindustani classical music, was a noted musician and guru of Indian classical music. Her uncles, Fakir Aftabuddin Khan and Ayet Ali Khan, were noted musicians at their native place Shibpur, in the present-day Bangladesh. Her brother Ali Akbar Khan was a legendary Sarod maestro and was considered a "national living treasure" in India and the USA. Annapurna was initially instructed by her father in the sitar and vocals. She then switched to the surbahar which she played in the traditional style of a rudra veena. One of her earliest concerts of note was with the surbahar when she played in honour of the Raja of Maihar. She was rewarded with a large tract of land for her performance.

On 15 May 1941, Annapurna Devi converted to Hinduism and married renowned sitarist, Ravi Shankar, in Almora. Between 1946 and 1955, Annapurna appeared on stage with Shankar in a handful of sitar-surbahar duets in Delhi and Bombay (now Mumbai). They had a son, Shubhendra Shankar (1942–1992), who was also a musician. The couple got divorced in 1982.

Annapurna married Rooshikumar Pandya in Bombay on 9 December 1982. Rooshikumar Pandya, who was 42 years old at the time of their marriage, was a well known communication expert and a successful sitarist in the United States. Rooshikumar had been learning sitar from her since 1973 at the recommendation of her brother, Ali Akbar Khan, who was also his guru (as was Ravi Shankar). He died in 2013 suddenly of a cardiac arrest at the age of 73. Annapurna Devi died of age related issues on 13 October 2018 in Mumbai.

Career
Annapurna Devi became a very accomplished surbahar (bass sitar) player of the Maihar gharana (school) within a few years of starting to take music lessons from her father Alauddin Khan. She started guiding many of her father's disciples, including Nikhil Banerjee and Bahadur Khan, in classical music as well as in the techniques and intricacies of instrumental performances. In 1941, age 14, she married one of her father's talented students, Ravi Shankar. She converted to Hinduism upon marriage.

In the 1950s, Ravi Shankar and Annapurna Devi performed duets in Delhi and Calcutta, principally at the college of her brother, Ali Akbar Khan. But later, Shankar she decided not to reduce and finally stop performing in public. Her student Vinay Ram says that she was uncomfortable accepting payment for concerts, as it was her belief that it was akin to selling Saraswati (the Goddess of learning).

Devi and Shankar's son, Shubhendra Shankar, (or "Subho", as he was popularly known) received rigorous training in sitar under her tutelage, until his father chose to interrupt his musical talim or training and took him to the United States. Shubhendra died at an early age, after a marriage and the birth of three children. Shubhendra did not have a solo career in classical music, but did for a period accompany his illustrious father Ravi Shankar in concerts in the USA and abroad. As per one of her students Vinay Ram, a conflict regarding the upbringing and musical teaching of Subho was the main reason for Devi and Shankar's separation, though they continued to remain in touch on amicable terms till the end.

Teaching
Annapurna Devi was an acclaimed instructor and one of the first women gurus of note in modern times. Her pupils were not restricted solely to sitar or surbahar players and encompassed various fields in Hindustani classical music. They included the sitarists Debi Prasad Chatterji, Bahadur Khan (a cousin), Hiren Roy, Indranil Bhattacharya, Kartik Kumar, and Nikhil Banerji, the sarodists, Dhyanesh Khan and Ashis Khan (sons of Ali Akbar), Basant Kabra, Pradeep Barot and Suresh Vyas, the bansuri players, Hariprasad Chaurasia and Nityanand Haldipur, the dilruba artist Dakshina Mohan Tagore, and the violinist Satyadev Pawar.

She was also the key figure of Acharya Alauddin Music Circle (an association in the memory of the late Alauddin Khan for promoting Indian classical music), in Mumbai.

Honours
 1977, she received the Padma Bhushan (India's third highest civilian honour).
 1991, she received the Sangeet Natak Akademi Award (the highest Indian honour in performing arts). She is the only surbahar player to be so honoured.
 1999, the Desikottama, an honorary doctorate degree by Visva-Bharati University.
 In 2004, she was made a fellow of the Sangeet Natak Akademi.

Notes

References

Sources
 
 
 
 
 
 Unveiling the Mystique of a Reclusive Artiste, Jaya Ramanathan, The Hindu, 28 June 2005.

External links
 
 Annapurna Devi's music, Source: The Vijaya Parrikar Library of Indian Classical Music
 Annapurna Devi by Mohan Nadkarni
 http://www.bigbridge.org/BB15/2011_BB_15_FEATURES/Annapurna_Devi/APD.pdf by Louise Landes Levi

1927 births
2018 deaths
Bengali musicians
Converts to Hinduism from Islam
Hindustani instrumentalists
Indian Hindus
Maihar gharana
Recipients of the Padma Bhushan in arts
Musicians from Madhya Pradesh
Pupils of Allauddin Khan
Recipients of the Sangeet Natak Akademi Award
Recipients of the Sangeet Natak Akademi Fellowship
Indian music educators
Women educators from Madhya Pradesh
20th-century Indian educators
Indian women classical musicians
20th-century Indian women musicians
Women musicians from Madhya Pradesh
Educators from Madhya Pradesh
20th-century Indian women singers
20th-century Indian singers
Women music educators
20th-century women educators
People from Satna district